Fucitol, also known as L-fucitol, 6-deoxy-L-galactitol, and (2R,3S,4R,5S)-hexane-1,2,3,4,5-pentol, is a sugar alcohol derived from fucoidan which is found in the North Atlantic seaweed Fucus vesiculosus or by the reduction of fucose.

See also
 Galactitol

References

External links

Sugar alcohols